The 2021 Ethiopian general election to elect members of the House of Peoples' Representatives was held on 21 June 2021 and 30 September 2021. Regional elections were also held on those dates.

The election was initially scheduled for 29 August 2020, but it was delayed due to the COVID-19 pandemic. Regional and municipal council elections were also planned to be held at the same time. In May 2020, the sitting House of Peoples' Representatives voted to postpone the election until 2021. In late December 2020, the National Election Board of Ethiopia (NEBE) said the election would take place on 5 June 2021, before it was further delayed until 21 June. It was the first multi-party election in Ethiopia since the 2005 election.

The Ethiopian People's Revolutionary Democratic Front (EPRDF), the political coalition that had dominated Ethiopian politics since the overthrow of the Derg regime in 1991, was dissolved on 1 December 2019. Three of its four-member parties, the Amhara Democratic Party (ADP), Oromo Democratic Party (ODP) and Southern Ethiopian People's Democratic Movement (SEPDM), merged to form the Prosperity Party, which inherited the EPRDF's role as the governing party. The last leader of the EPRDF, Prime Minister Abiy Ahmed, became the new party's first leader.

Bekele Gerba and Jawar Mohammed, members of the Oromo Federalist Congress (OFC), were imprisoned on 30 June 2020, following a crackdown by the government after the murder of Hachalu Hundessa. On 19 September 2020, both were charged with terrorism. Jawar denied the charges and claimed the arrests were politically motivated. The OFC and the Oromo Liberation Front were planning to participate in the election but withdrew, claiming that the results would be rigged under the Prime Minister.

The election was a landslide victory for the Prosperity Party. On 30 September 2021, voting took place in 47 constituencies of the Harari, SNNPR, and Somali regions. The House of Peoples' Representatives confirmed incumbent Abiy Ahmed as prime minister for a five-year term on 4 October 2021. African Union described the election as an improvement compared to the 2015 election and positively overall, urging the government to continue the commitment to democracy.

Background

Wollo, Amhara Region
A conflict between Oromo residents and Amhara Special Forces started in January 2021. According to Hassan Hadiya, a resident of Kemise, it started after Amhara Special Forces killed a person at the entrance of the grand mosque in Ataye, in the Oromia Zone of the Amhara Region. Another resident of Kemise, stated that the Amhara Liyu police were attacking civilians. Eyewitnesses blamed the regional Amhara Special Forces while the Amhara regional government accused both the OLF-Shene and TPLF of the violence. Two members of the Ethiopian parliament accused Amhara Liyu police of killing an Oromo civilian in Ataye, saying: "Amhara Militia used OLF-Shane as a pretext to commit war crime on Oromo farmers in Wollo for the three major reasons the MP said on 11th Session of parliament of Ethiopia. The reasons are: (1) their national identity (being an Oromo), (2) their religious identity (being Muslim), and (3) use the atrocity as a bargaining threat to fulfill all their demands in Oromia region." With regard to the attack of Wallo Oromos in the Oromia Zone of the Amhara Region by Amhara region militia in March 2021, the OPP and APP issued opposing statements, each blaming the other ethnic group for causing the violence and killings. The Borkena news website and an Amhara region official claimed that the OLF targeted Ataye.

Shashemene massacre 

Shashamane, a town south of Addis Ababa, was the scene of a pogrom massacre that targeted Orthodox Christians, ethnic Amharas, Gurages and other non-Oromos. The violence was triggered by the murder of singer Hachalu Hundessa in a Galan condominium. An umbrella humanitarian organization, OTAGE, has engaged a legal firm, specialising in international crimes, to bring those responsible to justice.

Tigray War

The Tigray People's Liberation Front (TPLF), the dominant component of the EPRDF, was the only constituent party that had not merged into the Prosperity Party. In September 2020, the Tigray Region held a regional election that the Prosperity Party-led government deemed illegal.

On 4 November, Tigray regional security forces attacked the headquarters of the Northern Command of the Ethiopian National Defense Force (ENDF), leading to armed conflict in the between the government and the Tigray region. In late 2020, the Tigray Region government was replaced by the Transitional Government of Tigray. TPLF was then dissolved by NEBE. There have been reports of war crimes committed against civilians since the breakout of the war.

Parties and coalitions

Delays 
In addition to the Tigray War, there have also been reports of delays in both constituencies and entire regions due to security concerns and logistics.

Constituencies 
On 22 May, the NEBE announced that 40 constituencies in six regions would not hold elections on the same day, but later. According to the Board, this was from a lack of voter registration, logistical issues, and security problems in many constituencies.

Regions 
On 6 June, the NEBE stated that due to irregularities in printing ballot papers, the election in the Harari Region and the Somali Region would be held in a second round on 6 September. This also came when the board announced voting would not take place in the war-torn Tigray Region. Combined, these regions constitute 63 out of 547 seats. In August, the voting date was moved once again to 30 September 2021.

Results 

On 10 July, partial election results were released with the Prosperity Party winning at least 410 seats, well enough to secure the majority and remain in power. The National Movement of Amhara won 5 seats, Ethiopian Citizens For Social Justice Party won 4 seats, Gedeo People's Democratic Party won 2 seats, and 1 seat went to an independent candidate. On 30 September 2021, the elections took place in 47 constituencies which had been delayed. Results from those constituencies were announced on 2 November 2021. On 4 October 2021, the House of Peoples' Representatives confirmed incumbent Abiy Ahmed as prime minister for a five-year term.

Reactions
Getachew Reda, a spokesperson for the Tigray People's Liberation Front, mocked the election in a tweet, saying the Tigray Defense Forces had captured hundreds of ENDF soldiers as a gift for Abiy's "coronation as the Naked Emperor of Ethiopia."

The African Union, which observed the conduct of the elections, said in a statement: It is noteworthy that the June 2021 general elections took place within the context of reforms that opened the political and civic space which enhanced the enjoyment of more basic rights and freedoms in comparison to the 2015 elections. Among the many positive political developments, the most prominent were the institutional strengthening of the NEBE, the release of political prisoners and the return of exiled political activists. The Mission concludes that despite some operational, logistical, security, political and COVID-19 related challenges, overall, the pre-election and Election Day processes were conducted in an orderly, peaceful and credible manner. There was nothing, in the Mission’s estimation, that distracted from the credible conduct of the elections. The Mission, therefore, commends all Ethiopians for the demonstrated commitment to the democratic development of the country. The AUEOM calls on all stakeholders to remain calm in the remaining electoral phase. The Mission urges any stakeholder that is dissatisfied with the electoral outcome to seek redress through the established legal and institutional mechanisms.Another observer delegation to the elections, a limited joint mission of the International Republican Institute and the National Democratic Institute, found that the elections had been preceded by promising political reforms, but that:political space, participation, and competition were acutely limited by widespread insecurity, open conflicts, and other serious constraints in the electoral environment... Though there were important improvements over past elections, particularly relating to the national election body and election monitoring by political parties and civil society, the environment fell short of essential standards for civil liberties, equitable campaign conditions, and security.Other civil society organisations expressed similar misgivings, as did the United States Secretary of State, who said in a statement that the "electoral process... was not free or fair for all Ethiopians". Five opposition parties – the Ethiopian Social Democratic Party, Balderas for True Democracy, National Movement of Amhara, Afar People's Party, and Ethiopian Citizens for Social Justice – submitted complaints about irregularities in the electoral process.

References

 

Ethiopia
General election
Ethiopia
Ethiopian civil conflict (2018–present)
General elections in Ethiopia
Ethiopia
Election and referendum articles with incomplete results